The 2022–23 George Washington Colonials men's basketball team represented George Washington University during the 2022–23 NCAA Division I men's basketball season. The team were led by first-year head coach Chris Caputo, and played their home games at Charles E. Smith Center in Washington, D.C. as a member of the Atlantic 10 Conference.

Previous season
The Colonials finished the 2021–22 season with a 12–19 record and a 8–9 record in Atlantic 10 play. They defeated Fordham in the first round of the 2021 Atlantic 10 men's basketball tournament before losing to George Mason.

Offseason

Departures

Incoming transfers

Recruiting classes

2022 recruiting class

2023 recruiting class

Roster

Schedule and results 

|-
!colspan=12 style=| Exhibition

|-
!colspan=12 style=|Non-conference regular season

|-
!colspan=12 style=|Atlantic 10 Regular Season

|-
!colspan=12 style=|A-10 tournament

Source

References

George Washington Colonials men's basketball seasons
George Washington Colonials
George Washington Colonials men's basketball
George Washington Colonials men's basketball